Bishal Khadka is Nepalese politician. He is currently Forest and Environment Minister of Bagmati Province.  He has served as a Central Committee Member of Unified Communist Party of Nepal (Maoist) and deputy In-charge of Dolakha District of Unified Communist Party of Nepal (Maoist). He is a current elected representative of Province 3, Dolakha-1 (A).

Political career
He has served as a Central Committee Member of Unified Communist Party of Nepal (Maoist) and deputy In-charge of Dolakha District of Unified Communist Party of Nepal (Maoist). He is a current elected representative of Province 3, Dolakha-1 (A).

Personal life
He has married to Sobi Budhathoki since March 10, 2013.

References

Nepalese politicians
Living people
1982 births